Farwell Independent School District is a public school district based in Farwell, Texas (USA).

Located in Parmer County, a small portion of the district extends into Bailey County.

In tribute to the school district's (and city's) namesake, the owners of the XIT Ranch, the school mascot is the steer.

In 2009, the school district was rated "academically acceptable" by the Texas Education Agency.

Schools
Farwell High School (Grades 9-12)
Farwell Junior High (Grades 6-8)
Farwell Elementary (Grades PK-5)

References

External links
Farwell ISD

School districts in Parmer County, Texas
School districts in Bailey County, Texas